Euchrysops mauensis, the Mau blue, is a butterfly in the family Lycaenidae. It is found in Ethiopia, Kenya, Tanzania, Rwanda, Burundi and Kivu in the Democratic Republic of the Congo. The habitat consists of open grassland.

Subspecies
Euchrysops mauensis mauensis (Kenya: highlands west of the Rift Valley, northern Tanzania, Rwanda, Burundi, Democratic Republic of the Congo: Kivu)
Euchrysops mauensis abyssiniae Storace, 1950 (Ethiopia)

References

Butterflies described in 1923
Euchrysops